Sous lieutenant François Portron was a French World War I flying ace credited with five aerial victories.

Biography
See also Aerial victory standards of World War I

François Portron was born in Lusignan, France on 13 June 1890.

He was recalled from the military reserves as the First World War started, being posted to an artillery regiment on 3 August 1914. He was sent to aviation service on 10 October as a supply sergeant.  On 21 January 1915, he was assigned to Escadrille V.24; on 20 February, he moved on to Escadrille C.39. He was subsequently selected for pilot's training. On 8 March 1916, he graduated with his Military Pilot's Brevet.

After further training, on 17 February 1917, he became a flight instructor. 
On 14 September, he was promoted from the enlisted ranks to Sous lieutenant. On 15 October 1917, he finally drew a combat assignment, with Escadrille N.31.

Beginning 22 May 1918 and ending 1 October 1918, François Portron scored five separate aerial victories, over a German reconnaissance plane, a scout, two Fokkers, and an observation balloon.

Honors and awards

 Legion d'honneur

 Croix de Guerre with five palmes and two etoiles de vermeil.

End notes

Reference

 Franks, Norman; Bailey, Frank (1993). Over the Front: The Complete Record of the Fighter Aces and Units of the United States and French Air Services, 1914–1918. London, UK: Grub Street Publishing.

Further reading

   (note: date of birth erroneously given as the 16th of June)

1890 births
1973 deaths
French World War I flying aces
Officiers of the Légion d'honneur
Recipients of the Croix de Guerre 1914–1918 (France)